Mustafa Avkıran (born 3 March 1963) is a Turkish actor.

Avkıran graduated from Mimar Sinan University State Conservatory in 1983. He then joined the cast of Istanbul State Theatre. Eventually he received his master's degree from Mimar Sinan University. For a period he was the manager of Antalya State Theare. In 2000, together with Theatre Playhouse, he founded the İSM 2. Kat acting institution. Avkıran is best known for his roles in TV series such as Kınalı Kar, Ezo Gelin, Yaprak Dökümü, Kuzey Güney, Filinta and Yeni Gelin.

Filmography 

Ateşten Günler (1987)
Ayaşlı ve Kiracıları (1989)
Yalnızlar (1991)
Zontellektüel Abdullah (1994)
Sokaktaki Adam (1995)
İstanbul Kanatlarımın Altında (1996) 
Kayıkçı (1998)
Kurtlar Sofrası (1999) 
Köstebek 2 (1999)
Yılan Hikayesi (1999–2001)
Kurşun Kalem (2000)
Pencereden Kar Geliyor (2001)
The Only Journey of His Life (2001)
Kınalı Kar (2002)
Beni Bekledinse (2004)
Köpek (2005)
Yaprak Dökümü (2008–2010)
Av Mevsimi (2010)
Kuzey Güney (2011–2013) 
Kaçak (2013–2014)
Sevdam Alabora (2015)
Delibal (2015)
Filinta (2015–2016)
Yeni Gelin (2017–2018)
Azize (2019)
Çukur (2020)
İçimizden Biri (2021)
Adım Farah (2023)

Awards
1995: Golden Orange Film Festival - "Best Supporting Actor" (Sokaktaki Adam)

References

External links
 
 

Living people
1963 births
Turkish Muslims
Turkish male television actors
Turkish male film actors
Turkish male stage actors